Power.org was an organization to develop and promote Power Architecture technology by establishing its open standards, guidelines, best practices, and certifications.

Power.org was founded in 2004 by IBM and 15 other companies. Freescale (later bought by NXP Semiconductors) joined in 2006 as an honorary founding member and was given similar status as IBM. One year later it announced a landmark technology development deal with IBM. Power.org had over 40 paying members as corporations, governmental, and educational institutions.

In 2013, Power.org was disestablished and replaced by OpenPOWER Foundation, which is responsible for developing and releasing open documentation.

History 
 
 Power.org is founded (Dec 2004)
 Freescale joins (Feb 2006) – Freescale joins Power.org.
 The brand – (July 2006) Establishing "Power Architecture" as a brand, unifying products based on Power, PowerPC, PowerQUICC and Cell under one common flag.
 Power ISA v2.03 (Nov 2006) – The unified instruction set for Power Architecture processors, joining 15 years of development on POWER and PowerPC architectures.
 Power Architecture Platform Reference or PAPR (Nov 2006) – The foundation for development of standard Power Architecture computers running the Linux operating system.
 Power Architecture Developer Conference (Sept 2007)
 Released the Common Debug API Specification (Dec 2008)
 Released the ePAPR specification (Dec 2008) – A specification for embedded systems.

Organization 
Power.org consisted of a Board of Directors which consists of founding members and others. Several committees and subcommittees governed and managed the organization's goals, projects, and responsibilities. Members had no veto rights in the decision processes of what defined the Power ISA, which was IBM's and Freescale's responsibility.

Power.org had a tiered membership model, with four levels: Founder, Sponsor, Participant, Associate and Developer. Developer membership was free of charge. Members included these:
  
 IBM (founder)
 Freescale (founder, later bought by NXP)
 Cadence (founder)
 Synopsys (founder)
 Airbus
 AMCC
 Barcelona Supercomputing Center
 Broadcom
 Bull
 Chartered
 Curtiss-Wright
 Denali

 ENEA
 Ericsson
 Genesi
 Green Hills Software
 HCL Technologies
 Kyocera
 Lauterbach
 LynuxWorks
 Mentor Graphics
 Mercury Computer Systems
 National Instruments
 OKI
 P.A. Semi
 
 Rapport
 Sony
 Terra Soft
 Thales Group
 Tundra Semiconductor
 Universität Mannheim
 University of Tennessee, Knoxville
 Virage Logic
 Virtutech
 Wind River
 Xilinx
 XGI Technology

Power Architecture
Power.org introduced and promoted Power Architecture, a collective marketing term for any specification, hardware, and software related to the POWER, PowerPC, and Power ISA architectures.

See also 
 OpenPOWER Foundation
Power ISA

References

External links 
  
  
  

Technology consortia
IBM